Count Alexei Grigorievich Razumovsky (1709–1771) was a Ukrainian-born Russian Registered Cossack who rose to become the lover, and it was suggested he was the morganatic spouse of the Empress Elizabeth Petrovna of Russia.  A member of the House of Razumovsky, he survived Elizabeth.  The matter of any children they may have had together is unresolved.

Early life
Alexei Grigorievich Razumovsky was born as Alexei (or Oleksiy) Rozum on 17 March 1709 (NS: 28 March) on Lemeshi, a farm in the area of Chernigov Regiment, Tsardom of Russia (now Ukraine), to the family of a registered Ukrainian-born Cossack, Gregory Rozum. In his youth he was a shepherd and he was taught to read and write by a rural sexton. Having a fine voice he sang in the choir at the village church. In 1731, Colonel Vyshnevsky, one of empress Anna Ivanovna's courtiers, while passing through the village on his way back to the Russian capital from a mission to Hungary, was impressed with his vocal ability, and took him to Saint Petersburg where he joined the choir of the Russian palace chapel as Alexei Grigoriev.

Razumovsky was handsome, which, along with his vocal talents, captivated Elizabeth Petrovna, who brought him to the imperial court in 1732. With the deportation of Elizabeth's then favourite, Alexis Shubin, Razumovsky became her favourite. After losing his voice, he was accepted in the post of the court bandura player, and then the manager of one of Elizabeth's mansions. He received the rank of the hof-quartermeister; and actually supervised Elizabeth's court. During the period of Anna Leopoldovna's reign he was made a Kamer-Junker.

Night Emperor
Razumovsky played an important role in the palace revolution of 25–26 November 1741 (NS 6–7 December), which brought about Elizabeth Petrovna's accession to the throne. On 30 November (NS 11 December) he was appointed as a chamberlain with the rank of a general-lieutenant. On the coronation day (25 April (NS: 6 May) 1742) he was made a Hofmarschall. Other honours bestowed on him included the Order of Saint Andrew and the Order of Alexander Nevsky, as well as being awarded numerous estates in Moscow and elsewhere.

Two years later in 1744, he received the comital title Reichsgraf (рейхграф in Russian) from the Holy Roman Emperor Charles VII and he was made a count in Russia in the same year. In 1745 he became the captain-lieutenant of the life-guards, and in 1748 he became the lieutenant-colonel of life-guards. On 5 September (NS: 16 September) 1756 he received the rank of field marshal. During Elizabeth Petrovna's reign he kept an exclusive position at court (though in his last years he was rivalled by the younger Ivan Shuvalov); in 1744, the empress visited his native village and met members of his family. Razumovsky's apartments in the Summer Palace directly adjoined to Elizabeth's apartments, and he had constant access to her.

Razumovsky was not interested in politics, but he quite often supported chancellor Bestuzhev. On his advice, the office of Ukrainian hetman was restored and his younger brother Kirill Razumovsky was made a hetman and president of the Russian Academy of Sciences.

Later years

Before her death, the empress made her successor Peter III promise not to offend her favourites. In 1762, Razumovsky submitted his resignation and moved from the Winter Palace to the Anichkov Palace, which had been presented to him by Elizabeth. After Catherine II's accession to the throne, Razumovsky refused the title of highness that was offered to him. At the empress's request, he destroyed all documents about his marriage with Elizabeth. He died on 6 July (NS 17 July) 1771 in St. Petersburg and was buried in the Annunciation Church of the Alexandro-Nevskaya Lavra.

The question of Razumovsky and Elizabeth Petrovna's children remains unresolved and subject to many legends. The best known pretenders were two princesses Tarakanova, one of whom (Augusta Tarakanova) became a nun under the name Dosifeya.  She died in 1810 and was buried in the Romanov family crypt; another (Elizabeth Tarakanova) was arrested in Livorno, Tuscany by Aleksei Grigoryevich Orlov and returned to Russia in February 1775. She was then imprisoned in the Peter and Paul Fortress, where she died from tuberculosis. The legend of her being drowned during the floods of 1777 served as the plot for a painting by artist Konstantin Flavitsky (1864, Tretyakov Gallery).

References 

1709 births
1771 deaths
Field marshals of Russia
Ukrainian people in the Russian Empire
Kobzarstvo
Torbanists
Alexei
18th-century people from the Russian Empire
Male lovers of Russian royalty
Princes of the Holy Roman Empire
Morganatic spouses of Russian royalty
Burials at the Annunciation Church of the Alexander Nevsky Lavra
Recipients of the Order of the White Eagle (Poland)